"Across 110th Street" is a single by Bobby Womack, from the soundtrack and film of the same name that starred Anthony Quinn and Yaphet Kotto.

Background

The single was released in February 1973 on the United Artists label. Credited to Bobby Womack and Peace, who had a hit previously with "Harry Hippie", it was composed by B. Womack and J. J. Johnson. Its B-side was "Hang On In There", composed by B. Womack.
The March 31 issue of Billboard reported that it was his fourth hit in a year. For the week ending May 5, 1973 with the single in its sixth week in the charts, the Billboard best selling soul singles chart showed the single was at position 24 with the previous week's position being 19. Meanwhile, the chart showed the album in its 14th week, maintaining its position at 15.

Personnel
 Unidentified orchestra including
 Carol Kaye – electric bass
 Emil Richards – percussion

Certifications

Chart performance

Single releases
 Bobby Womack & Peace - "Across 110th Street" / "Hang On In There" - United Artists XW 196 - 1973

Other versions
It is covered by Calvin Richardson on his 2009 album Facts of Life – The Soul of Bobby Womack and by Ania Dąbrowska on her Ania Movie (October 2015). A version featuring Bobby Womack appears on the Los Lobos album The Ride in a medley with the song "Wicked Rain".

Popular culture
The song was given a revival when it was prominently featured in Quentin Tarantino's 1997 film Jackie Brown. It was also featured in Ridley Scott's 2007 film American Gangster. 50 Cent told NME that 110th Street was the first song with which "he fell in love...because of how the situation was for black people in America at that time, there were a lot of struggle songs around. It seemed to be something that really moved the people around me. I felt the power of music to raise people up; to make them angry or proud."

References

1973 singles
Bobby Womack songs
Songs about streets
Songs about New York City